Thomas Edgar Martin (born May 21, 1970) is a former Major League Baseball relief pitcher. He batted and threw left-handed.

Career
Martin was selected by the Baltimore Orioles in the sixth round of the  Major League Baseball Draft. Martin was traded to the San Diego Padres on February 17,  for Jim Lewis and Steve Martin. In the  minor league draft, Martin was selected from the Padres by the Atlanta Braves where he made it as high as Triple-A before being released on January 25, . He appeared in relief in 55 games that season with an impressive 2.09 ERA. The Arizona Diamondbacks selected Martin in the 1997 MLB Expansion Draft, but traded him to the Cleveland Indians along with Travis Fryman for Matt Williams thirteen days later. For the next three seasons, Martin would be up and down between the majors and minors, before he was traded to the New York Mets for Javier Ochoa on January 11, . Becoming a free agent at the end of the season, Martin signed with the Tampa Bay Devil Rays, but was released on September 9, .

On February 26, Martin signed with the Los Angeles Dodgers where he enjoyed success keeping his ERA under 4. On July 31, the day of the non-waiver trade deadline, the Dodgers traded Martin to the Atlanta Braves for Matt Merricks. Released by the Braves on April 14, he was signed by the team he made his major league debut for, the Houston Astros, but was released two and a half months later without appearing in a major league game. Martin signed with the Colorado Rockies on January 18, spending the entire year in the majors. He was released by the Dodgers on March 10.

On April 22, 2008, Martin signed with the Long Island Ducks of the independent Atlantic League. In 6 games, he had a 3.38 ERA and 6 strikeouts.

In January , he signed a minor league contract with the New York Mets and was invited to spring training. On March 22, he was released due to a broken wrist. He re-signed a minor league contract on May 15. On June 23, 2009, Martin was released by the Mets.

References

External links

Tom Martin at Baseball Almanac
Tom Martin at Pura Pelota (Venezuelan Professional Baseball League)

1970 births
Living people
Akron Aeros players
American expatriate baseball players in Mexico
Atlanta Braves players
Baseball players from South Carolina
Bluefield Orioles players
Brooklyn Cyclones players
Buffalo Bisons (minor league) players
Cleveland Indians players
Colorado Rockies players
Colorado Springs Sky Sox players
Durham Bulls players
Erie Orioles players
Greenville Braves players
High Desert Mavericks players
Houston Astros players
Jackson Generals (Texas League) players
Kane County Cougars players
Long Island Ducks players
Los Angeles Dodgers players
Major League Baseball pitchers
Mexican League baseball pitchers
Navegantes del Magallanes players
American expatriate baseball players in Venezuela
New York Mets players
Norfolk Tides players
Rancho Cucamonga Quakes players
Richmond Braves players
Round Rock Express players
San Angelo Colts players
Sportspeople from Charleston, South Carolina
Tampa Bay Devil Rays players
Tigres del México players
Tucson Toros players
Waterloo Diamonds players
Wausau Timbers players